Les Fleurs du mal is an 1857 volume of French poetry by Charles Baudelaire.

Les Fleurs du mal may also refer to:

 Les Fleurs du mal (Léo Ferré album), 1957
 Les Fleurs du mal (suite et fin), an album by Léo Ferré, 2008
 Les Fleurs du Mal (Sopor Aeternus & the Ensemble of Shadows album), 2007
 Les Fleurs du Mal (Therion album), 2012
 Les Fleurs Du Mal, an album by Blood, 2007
 "Fleurs du Mal", a song by Sarah Brightman from Symphony, 2008
 Fleur du Mal, lingerie and ready-to-wear brand

See also 
 Flower of Evil (disambiguation)